The 34th CARIFTA Games was held in the Dwight Yorke Stadium in Bacolet, Tobago on March 26–28, 2005.  The event was relocated from the National Stadium, St. George's, Grenada, because of the aftermath of Hurricane Ivan destroying 90 percent of the island's houses.    An appraisal of the results has been given.

Participation (unofficial)

Detailed result lists can be found on the CACAC, the CFPI and the "World
Junior Athletics History" website.  An unofficial count yields
the number of about 427 athletes (215 junior (under-20) and 212 youth
(under-17)) from about 25 countries:  Anguilla (3), Antigua and Barbuda (10),
Aruba (2), Bahamas (51), Barbados (37), Bermuda (12), British Virgin Islands
(7), Cayman Islands (16), Dominica (5), French Guiana (1), Grenada (31),
Guadeloupe (19), Guyana (8), Haiti (11), Jamaica (69), Martinique (31),
Montserrat (2), Netherlands Antilles (6), Saint Kitts and Nevis (8), Saint
Lucia (8), Saint Vincent and the Grenadines (3), Suriname (3), Trinidad and
Tobago (59), Turks and Caicos Islands (18), US Virgin Islands (7).

Records

A total of 4 new games records were set.  

In the boys' U-20 category, Grégory Gamyr from Martinique achieved 18.11
metres in shot put.

In the boys' U-17 category, Theon O'Connor from Jamaica set the new 800m
games record to 1:53.72.  The 4x400 metres relay team from Trinidad and Tobago set the new games
record to 3:15.09.

In the girls' U-17 category, the 4x100 metres relay team from Jamaica finished in
45.43 seconds.

Moreover, a total of 8 national (senior) records were set by the junior athletes.  In the men's category, Junior Hines set the 3000 metres
record for the Cayman Islands to 9:59.68. 

In the women's category, individual records were set by Shara Proctor (long jump, 6.24m, wind: +0.9 m/s) for 
Anguilla,
by Skyler Wallen 
(1500 metres, 4:44.79) for the Bahamas,
by La Troya Darrell (triple jump, 12.29m, wind: -0.9 m/s) for 
Bermuda, 
by Opal Bodden (triple jump, 10.70m, wind: +0.8 m/s) for 
the Cayman Islands,
and by Sanny Eugene (800 metres, 2:12.75) for 
the U.S. Virgin Islands.
Moreover, the 4x100 metres relay teams of 
Grenada (45.41s) and 
the Turks and Caicos Islands
(51.88s) established new national records.

Austin Sealy Award

The Austin Sealy Trophy for the
most outstanding athlete of the games was awarded to Theon O'Connor of
Jamaica.  He won 2 gold medals (800m, and 1500m) in
the youth (U-17) category, setting a new 800m games record.

Medal summary
Medal winners are published by category: Boys under 20 (Junior), Girls under 20 (Junior), Boys under 17 (Youth), and Girls under 17 (Youth).
Complete results can be found on the CACAC, the CFPI and the "World Junior Athletics History"
website.

Boys under 20 (Junior)

o: Open event for both junior and youth athletes.

Girls under 20 (Junior)

o: Open event for both junior and youth athletes.

Boys under 17 (Youth)

Girls under 17 (Youth)

Medal table (unofficial)

The medal count has been published.  There is a mismatch between the unofficial medal count and the
published medal count for the Bahamas and Trinidad and Tobago.  This can be explained by
the fact that there were only three competitors in the boys U20 pole
vault event, 
therefore not having been considered in the published medal count.

References

External links
World Junior Athletics History

CARIFTA Games
International sports competitions hosted by Grenada
2005 in Trinidad and Tobago sport
CARIFTA
2005 in Grenadian sport
2005 in Caribbean sport
Athletics competitions in Grenada
International athletics competitions hosted by Trinidad and Tobago